The Legislative Assembly of Upper Canada was the elected part of the legislature for the province of Upper Canada, functioning as the lower house in the Parliament of Upper Canada.  Its legislative power was subject to veto by the appointed Lieutenant Governor, Executive Council, and Legislative Council.

The first elections in Upper Canada, in which only land-owning males were permitted to vote, were held in August 1792.

The first session of the Assembly's sixteen members occurred in Newark, Upper Canada on 17 September 1792. Shortly before the capital of Upper Canada was moved to York in 1796 the Assembly was dissolved and reconvened for twelve more sessions between 1797 and 1840 in modest buildings in the new capital. Members continued to be elected by land-owning males to represent counties and the larger towns.

During the War of 1812, American troops set fire to the buildings of the Assembly.

Political divisions

Following the war, the executive and legislative councils became increasingly dominated by the Family Compact, a clique of wealthy individuals led primarily by John Strachan (a member of the powerful Executive Council of Upper Canada), which emerged in 1815. The compact was deeply opposed to American republicanism and favoured full establishment for the Anglican church in Upper Canada. Their increasingly authoritarian style of governance and disregard for the will of the Legislative Assembly led to demands for government that was more responsible to the people and eventually the Upper Canada Rebellion of 1837. Opposing the Family Compact were initially an assortment of anti-establishment members, but it did not gain strength until a more formal group of reformers emerged, initially led by William Warren Baldwin starting 1820s and then by William Lyon Mackenzie in the 1830s.

The 1840 Act of Union united Upper and Lower Canada into the single Province of Canada and, from this point until Confederation in 1867, a joint parliament was held for the united provinces.

List of parliaments 
1st Parliament of Upper Canada 1792–1796
2nd Parliament of Upper Canada 1797–1800
3rd Parliament of Upper Canada 1801–1804
4th Parliament of Upper Canada 1805–1808
5th Parliament of Upper Canada 1808–1812
6th Parliament of Upper Canada 1812–1816
7th Parliament of Upper Canada 1817–1820
8th Parliament of Upper Canada 1821–1824
9th Parliament of Upper Canada 1825–1828
10th Parliament of Upper Canada 1829–1830
11th Parliament of Upper Canada 1831–1834
12th Parliament of Upper Canada 1835–1836
13th Parliament of Upper Canada 1837–1840

Speakers

Changing loyalties

A few members of the legislature eventually left Canada. Some left Canada to join the United States Army during the War of 1812. Some were involved in the Rebellion of 1837 and other just simply abandoned Canada. Most moved to the United States, some left for Great Britain.

Buildings housing the Legislative Assembly

 Navy Hall at Newark (1792)
 First (1793–1813) and second (1820–1824) Parliament Buildings of Upper Canada at York

From 1824 to 1832, the Assembly sat at temporary locations due to the fire that destroyed the second home:

 Residence of the Chief Justice of Upper Canada (1824-1829)
 Old York County Court House on King between Toronto and Church Streets (1829–1832)
 Ballroom of York Hotel at York – one session 1813
 York General Hospital (1824–1829)
 Third Parliament Buildings of Upper Canada (1832–1840)

See also
 Legislative Council of Upper Canada
 Executive Council of Upper Canada
 Lieutenant Governors of Upper Canada, 1791–1841
 Legislative Assembly of the Province of Canada

References 
Handbook of Upper Canadian Chronology, Frederick H. Armstrong, Toronto : Dundurn Press, 1985.

External links
James G. Chewett, "The Upper Canada almanac, and provincial calendar, for the year of Our Lord 1827: being the third after bissextile or leap year, and the eighth year of the reign of His Majesty [King G]eorge the Fourth ..." (York (Toronto): Robert Stanton, 1827), 76, ii pp.
James G. Chewett, "The Upper Canada almanac and astronomical calendar for the year of Our Lord 1828: being bissextile or leap year and the ninth year of the reign of His Majesty King George the Fourth ..." (York (Toronto): Robert Stanton, 1828), 76, ii pp.
James G. Chewett, "The Upper Canada almanac, and provincial calendar, for the year of Our Lord 1831: being the third after bissextile, or leap year, and the second year of the reign of His Majesty King William the Fourth ..." (York (Toronto): Robert Stanton, 1831), 103, ii pp.
Government of Ontario site

1792 establishments in Upper Canada

Canada, Upper